The Temptations Show was a one-hour syndicated television special starring Motown singing group The Temptations, which aired on July 10, 1969. Produced by Motown Productions, it guest-starred George Kirby and Kaye Stevens.

Among the featured musical numbers were Temptations singles such as "Get Ready", "Cloud Nine", and "Run Away Child, Running Wild", pop standards such as  "Ol' Man River" and "Swanee"., and a closing number, "Somebody's Keepin' Score", featuring an (early) "rap" by all three stars. Along with the TCB special in 1968, which featured both the Temptations and Diana Ross & The Supremes, this was one of Dennis Edwards' first appearances with the group. A soundtrack of the show was released on Motown's Gordy label as GS 933 that same year. The soundtrack was also issued on 8-Track GOR-8-1933

Track listing

References

1960s American television specials
Music television specials
1969 soundtrack albums
Television soundtracks
The Temptations soundtracks
Gordy Records soundtracks
1969 television specials
1969 in American television